is a Japanese football player. He plays for Ehime FC.

Career
Taishi Nishioka joined J3 League club FC Ryukyu in 2017.

Club statistics
Updated to 22 February 2018.

References

External links
Profile at FC Ryukyu

1994 births
Living people
Fukuoka University alumni
Association football people from Miyazaki Prefecture
Japanese footballers
J3 League players
J2 League players
FC Ryukyu players
Ehime FC players
Association football defenders